Cape Disappointment is a headland which forms the southern extremity of South Georgia. It was first charted and so named in 1775 by a British expedition under James Cook, who upon reaching this position was greatly disappointed in realizing that South Georgia was an island rather than a continent.

References
 

Headlands of South Georgia